Miss Rodeo America is an annual pageant to select the official spokesperson for the Professional Rodeo Cowboys Association.

Current Miss Rodeo America 2023

The Miss Rodeo America 2023 Pageant was held Sunday, December 4, 2022, at the South Point Hotel and Casino in Las Vegas. At the pageant, Kennadee Riggs was crowned Miss Rodeo America. Kennadee, from Queen Creek, Arizona, previously served as the 2022 Miss Rodeo Arizona.

History
The Miss Rodeo America pageant is held in December of every year in conjunction with the National Finals Rodeo (NFR). The competition takes place in Las Vegas, Nevada. Reigning state rodeo queens from across America are eligible to compete for the title and are judged on their appearance, horsemanship, and personality. The winner receives over $20,000 in prizes, including a crown that fits on her cowboy hat, scholarships, Montana Silversmiths jewelry and belt buckles, Justin Boots and Wrangler apparel. She reigns for one year and is expected to travel more than 120,000 miles during her reign. She also makes public appearances at schools and other venues to promote rodeo. Miss Rodeo America was inaugurated in 1956, and the first winner was Marilyn Scott Freimark, who later became a rancher. Kennadee Riggs of Arizona is the 2023 Miss Rodeo America. She is the fifth woman from her state to win the title.

Winners
This is a list of women who have won the Miss Rodeo America crown.

Miss Rodeo America Scholarship Foundation 
The Miss Rodeo America program provides one of the most visible media spokespersons for the sport of professional rodeo and the Western way of life. Since its inception in 1955, the Miss Rodeo America Pageant has recognized the need for scholarships to help contestants further their education. The Miss Rodeo America Scholarship Foundation was established in 1997 to broaden the scope of the scholarship program. The winner of Miss Rodeo America receives a $20,000 Educational Scholarship from the Miss Rodeo America Scholarship Foundation, with various other scholarships being awarded for winners of categories and recognition in other areas. Every contestant receives at a minimum $1,000 just for competing.

See also

 Miss Rodeo USA
 Professional Rodeo Cowboys Association

References

External links
Official Site
Miss Rodeo USA

Beauty pageants in the United States
Rodeo-affiliated events
Beauty pageants in North America
Rodeo promoters and managers